HD 223229 is a suspected variable star in the northern constellation of Andromeda. It is a double star consisting of a magnitude 6.11 primary and a magnitude 8.73 companion. The pair have an angular separation of 0.80″ along a position angle of 250°, as of 2009. The primary is a B-type subgiant star with a stellar classification of B3IV. It has an estimated 6.3 times the mass of the Sun, with an effective temperature of 17,900 K.

References

External links
 Image HD 223229
 

Andromeda (constellation)
223229
B-type subgiants
9011
Suspected variables
Durchmusterung objects
117340